Mark Wayne Cockerell (born April 24, 1962) is a former American figure skater. He is the 1976 World Junior champion, the 1978 Nebelhorn Trophy silver medalist, and a three-time U.S. senior national medalist (bronze in 1983 and in 1984, silver in 1985).

Personal life 
Cockerell was born April 24, 1962, in Burbank, California. He was married to Soviet figure skater Elena Kvitchenko, with whom he has a daughter, Anya (born in 1999), and a son, Nick. Anya figure skates and Nick plays and coaches hockey.

Career 
Cockerell won gold at the World Junior Championships in the event's inaugural year, 1976. After moving up to the senior level, he won silver at three international competitions – the 1978 Nebelhorn Trophy in West Germany, 1978 Grand Prix International St. Gervais in France, and 1980 Ennia Challenge Cup in the Netherlands.

Cockerell won his first senior national medal, bronze, at the 1983 U.S. Championships. He finished 14th at the 1983 World Championships in Helsinki, Finland.

The following season, he won another national bronze medal and was named in the U.S. team to the 1984 Winter Olympics in Sarajevo, Yugoslavia. He became the first man to execute a triple-triple jump combination at the Olympics, an exemplification of his talent and dedication as a skater, and finished 13th overall after placing 18th in compulsory figures, 17th in the short program, and tenth in the free skate. Concluding his season, he placed 13th at the 1984 World Championships in Ottawa, Ontario, Canada.

Cockerell was awarded the silver medal at the 1985 U.S. Championships, having placed second to Brian Boitano. He finished 8th at the 1985 World Championships in Tokyo, Japan.

Coaching 
Cockerell now coaches at the Plex Hiwire Sports Center in Irmo, South Carolina.

Results

References

Navigation

Figure skaters at the 1984 Winter Olympics
Olympic figure skaters of the United States
American male single skaters
1962 births
Living people
World Junior Figure Skating Championships medalists
Sportspeople from Burbank, California